Patrick Bonnet (born 6 September 1957) is a former French racing cyclist. He rode in five editions of the Tour de France between 1979 and 1984.

Major results

1979
 1st Prologue Tour de Corse
 4th Overall Grand Prix du Midi Libre
 4th GP Ouest-France
1980
 1st  Overall Tour de l'Oise
1st Prologue
 1st Stage 4 Tour du Limousin
 2nd Overall Route du Sud
 8th GP Ouest-France
1981
 Tour de l'Avenir
1st Stages 5 & 6
1st  Points classification
 1st Stages 1 & 3a Tour d'Armorique
 2nd Overall Tour de l'Oise
 6th Paris–Tours
 6th Paris–Bruxelles
 10th Overall Critérium International
1982
 1st Stage 1 1982 Giro d'Italia (TTT)
 2nd Overall Tour de l'Aude
 3rd Overall Étoile de Bessèges
1983
 1st Prologue Tour du Vaucluse
 3rd Overall Grand Prix du Midi Libre
1984
 2nd Grand Prix de Plumelec-Morbihan
 7th Overall Grand Prix du Midi Libre
1st Prologue

References

External links
 

1957 births
Living people
French male cyclists
Sportspeople from Montpellier
Cyclists from Occitania (administrative region)